Sir Humphrey Starkey  (died 1486) was a British justice.

He studied at Inner Temple and was made Recorder of London in 1471. In 1478 he was made a Serjeant-at-Law, allowing him to practice in the Court of Common Pleas. He served briefly as Lord Chief Baron of the Exchequer in 1483 but was moved later that year, becoming Fourth Justice of the Court of Common Pleas and dying in office in 1486.

He had previously married Isabella, who outlived him but died in 1496; their four daughters split his estate Wouldham between them. His daughter Anne Starkey (d. 26 December 1488) married firstly John Writtle, esquire, and secondly Sir John Raynsford (died 1521) and they were the parents of Sir John Raynsford the politician.

Notes

References

15th-century births
1486 deaths
Members of the Inner Temple
Serjeants-at-law (England)
Chief Barons of the Exchequer
15th-century English judges
People of the Tudor period
Recorders of London
People from Wouldham